The Col de la Core (elevation ) is a mountain pass in the  Ariège department of France in the Pyrenees. It connects Audressein with Seix.

Details of climb
The climb proper starts at Les Bordes-sur-Lez, from where it is 14.1 km at 5.7%, with the steepest section being at 8.0%.

Appearances in Tour de France
The Col de la Core was first used in the Tour de France in 1984, since when it has featured eight times, most recently in 2021, when the leader over the summit was Patrick Konrad.

References

Mountain passes of Ariège (department)
Mountain passes of the Pyrenees